Gérard Vincent La Forest  (born April 1, 1926) is a former puisne justice of the Supreme Court of Canada. He served there from January 16, 1985 to September 30, 1997. He is currently counsel at law firm Stewart McKelvey in Fredericton, New Brunswick.

Early life and education
Born in Grand Falls, New Brunswick, to J. Alfred La Forest and Philomène Lajoie, he first studied at St. Francis Xavier University and then went on to study law at the University of New Brunswick, obtaining a BCL in 1949. Following law school he was awarded a Rhodes scholarship and attended St John's College, Oxford receiving a BA in 1951 and an MA in 1956. He then went on the study at Yale University, completing an LL.M in 1965 and an LL.D in 1966. He was called to the Bar of New Brunswick in 1949 and was designated a Queen's Counsel in 1968.

Career
From 1952 to 1955 he worked in the federal Department of Justice then later as a legal advisor. In 1956 La Forest began teaching at the University of New Brunswick, moving to the University of Alberta to become Dean of the Faculty of Law in 1968.

From 1970 to 1974, he went back to work for the federal government as Assistant Deputy Attorney General of Canada (Research & Planning). Afterwards he was a member of the Law Reform Commission of Canada, until 1979 at which point he returned to teaching at the University of Ottawa.

In 1977, following the election of the separatist Parti Québécois government the previous year, the Canadian Bar Association set up a  Committee on the Constitution.  The Committee's mandate was to study and make recommendations on the Constitution of Canada. La Forest was asked to be the executive director for the committee's work.  The members of the Committee were drawn from each province of Canada, and included two future provincial premiers, two future provincial chief justices, and a future Canadian Ambassador to the United Nations.  The Committee presented its report to the CBA at the next annual meeting, in 1978.  The Committee made wide-ranging recommendations for constitutional change, including a completely new constitution, abolishing the monarchy, changing the Senate, entrenching language rights and a bill of rights, and changing the balance of powers between the federal government and the provinces.

In 1981 he was appointed to the New Brunswick Court of Appeal. Then on January 16, 1985 he was appointed to the Supreme Court of Canada, staying until September 30, 1997.

Honours, awards and affiliations
In 1975, he was made a Fellow of the Royal Society of Canada. He was awarded honorary LL.D. degrees from the University of Basel (1981), St. Francis Xavier University (1988), St. Thomas University (1988), University of Alberta (1988), University of Moncton (1988) and Bates College (1990). He was made Doctor of Civil Law by the University of New Brunswick in 1985, the same year he received a D.U. from the University of Ottawa.

In 2000, he was made a Companion of the Order of Canada.

Published works

References

External links
 
 

1926 births
20th-century Canadian civil servants
Acadian people
Alumni of St John's College, Oxford
Canadian legal scholars
Canadian King's Counsel
Canadian Rhodes Scholars
Canadian Roman Catholics
Canadian university and college faculty deans
Companions of the Order of Canada
Fellows of the Royal Society of Canada
Justices of the Supreme Court of Canada
Lawyers in New Brunswick
Living people
People from Grand Falls, New Brunswick
Academic staff of the University of Alberta
University of New Brunswick alumni
Academic staff of the University of New Brunswick
Yale University alumni
University of New Brunswick Faculty of Law alumni